In mathematics, more specifically in topology, the Volodin space  of a ring R is a subspace of the classifying space  given by

The space is acyclic and the fundamental group  is the Steinberg group  of R. In fact,  showed that X yields a model for Quillen's plus-construction  in algebraic K-theory.

Application 

This theorem was a pioneering result in the area of trace methods.

Notes

References 
 

 
 , (Translation: Math. USSR Izvestija Vol. 5 (1971) No. 4, 859–887)

Algebraic topology
Homotopy theory
Fiber bundles
Representable functors